German submarine U-504 was a Type IXC U-boat of Nazi Germany's Kriegsmarine during World War II. The submarine was laid down on 29 April 1940 at the Deutsche Werft yard in Hamburg as yard number 294, launched on 24 April 1941 and commissioned on 30 July 1941 under the command of Korvettenkapitän Hans-Georg Friedrich "Fritz" Poske. Initially attached to the 4th U-boat Flotilla for training, the U-boat was transferred to the 2nd flotilla on 1 January 1942 for front-line service. She was a member of six wolfpacks.

Design
German Type IXC submarines were slightly larger than the original Type IXBs. U-504 had a displacement of  when at the surface and  while submerged. She had two shafts and two  propellers.

U-504 was fitted with six  torpedo tubes (four fitted at the bow and two at the stern), 22 torpedoes, one  SK C/32 naval gun, 180 rounds, and a  SK C/30 as well as a  C/30 anti-aircraft gun. The boat had a complement of forty-eight.

Service history

First patrol
U-504s first war patrol took her from Kiel in Germany, to her home port of Lorient, in occupied France, between 6 and 20 January 1942 without incident.

Second patrol
On 25 January 1942 U-504 sailed from Lorient, and headed across the Atlantic to the Florida coast. Struck by two torpedoes, the ship settled by the stern, and the crew abandoned ship and rowed to shore. The badly damaged ship eventually drifted onto reefs about five miles (8 km) due east of Hobe Sound, Florida and finally sank on the afternoon of 23 February.

The ship, loaded with gasoline, was hit by two torpedoes, setting it on fire and breaking it in two. The ship sank within eight minutes, killing all 49 of the crew.

U-504s final victim was the unescorted British 5,966 GRT merchant ship Stangarth, sunk on 16 March, by a single torpedo, north-east of San Juan, Puerto Rico. There were no survivors from her crew of 46. U-504 arrived back at Lorient on 1 April after 67 days at sea.

Third patrol
The U-boat then sailed for a patrol in the Caribbean Sea, departing Lorient on 2 May 1942. Her first success came on 29 May when she sank the unescorted British 1,597 GRT cargo ship Allister, en route from Kingston, Jamaica, to Tampa, Florida, with a cargo of 500 tons of bananas.

On 8 June U-504 struck twice, east of the Yucatán Peninsula. At 06:59 she sank the unescorted 3,901 GRT Honduran merchant ship Tela with two torpedoes, sinking her within five minutes. At 18:06 the U-boat opened fire with her deck gun on the unescorted British 1,512 GRT merchant ship Rosenborg, after missing the ship with two torpedoes. She fired 60 shells, of which about 30 hit. Four of the crew were killed, the remaining 23 were later picked up and landed in Panama.

The U-boat struck again twice in a single day, 11 June, off Honduras. She sank the unescorted Dutch 4,282 GRT passenger ship Crijnssen at 02:10 with three torpedoes, then the unescorted and unarmed American 4,846 GRT merchant ship American at 18:01. The ship, carrying 6,500 tons of manganese ore, coffee, gunny sacks, jute and oil, from Santos, Brazil, to New Orleans, was hit by two torpedoes, and then a third eleven minutes later. The ship sank in 25 minutes. The crew of eight officers and 30 men abandoned ship. Finally, on 14 June, she torpedoed and sank the Latvian 3,280 GRT cargo ship Regent. U-504 arrived back at Lorient on 7 July after 67 days at sea.

Fourth patrol
U-504 left Lorient again on 19 August 1942 and sailed south to the waters off South Africa as part of Wolfpack Eisbär. On the 23rd she sank the British 5,669 GRT , and on the 26th she attacked the unescorted American 7,176 GRT Liberty ship Anne Hutchinson. The crew abandoned their vessel after she was hit by two torpedoes and fatally damaged. However the ship remained afloat, and on the 29th was taken in tow by the South African armed trawler HMSAS David Haigh (T13) and a harbour tug. Lacking sufficient power to tow the ship to port explosive charges were set, cutting the ship in two. The aft section sank, and the fore section was towed into Port Elizabeth. Part of the crew were picked up at sea, while the rest made it to land in their lifeboats.

First the unescorted 7,041 GRT Empire Guidon, then the unescorted 5,113 GRT Reynolds, which, hit amidships and in the stern, capsized and sank within seconds.

Finally on 3 November she sank the unescorted and unarmed Brazilian 5,187 GRT cargo ship Porto Alegre en route from Rio de Janeiro to Durban, off Port Elizabeth. Hit by a single torpedo, the crew abandoned ship before the U-boat delivered the coup de grâce. Only one crew member was lost. U-504 arrived back at Lorient on 11 December 1942 after a patrol lasting 115 days.

Fifth and sixth patrol
U-504 left Lorient on 19 January 1943, now under the command of Kapitänleutnant Wilhelm Luis, and headed out into the Atlantic waters south of the Azores. She was subjected to attacks by unidentified Allied aircraft outbound on 21 January and inbound on 12 March, but was not damaged by either. She returned to Lorient on 24 March after 65 days at sea, without making any successful attacks.

Her next patrol took her to the waters south of Greenland between 21 April and 29 May 1943, again without result.

Seventh patrol
U-504s final patrol began on 27 July 1943 under the newly promoted Korvettenkapitän Wilhelm Luis.

Wolfpacks
U-504 took part in six wolfpacks, namely:
 Eisbär (25 August – 1 September 1942)
 Rochen (16 February – 1 March 1943)
 Tümmler (1 – 22 March 1943)
 Amsel 1 (3 – 6 May 1943)
 Elbe (7 – 10 May 1943)
 Elbe 2 (10 – 14 May 1943)

Summary of raiding history

References

Bibliography

External links

German Type IX submarines
U-boats commissioned in 1941
U-boats sunk in 1943
U-boats sunk by British warships
U-boats sunk by depth charges
World War II submarines of Germany
World War II shipwrecks in the Atlantic Ocean
1941 ships
Ships built in Hamburg
Ships lost with all hands
Maritime incidents in July 1943